The Alexander Film Company produced films to be shown during intermission in movie theaters.

The Alexander Film Company was founded in 1919 in Spokane, Washington and later based in Colorado Springs, Colorado. It produced films that were shown during the intermission at movie theaters. These films were a mixture of announcements and paid advertisements.

History

The Alexander Film Company was once the world's largest producer of theater film advertising. In today's movie theaters, theater film advertising is what is shown before the trailers which are shown before the featured film, like Filmack and National Screen Service. While the Alexander Film Co. only made a whopping $2.50 its first year, the use of advertisements in local movie theaters quickly gained acceptance from theater owners and businesses nationwide. The use of theater advertising grew so rapidly in the early twenties that Alexander Film Co. decided to relocate to a larger studio in Englewood, Colorado in 1923 and then again in 1928 to an even larger lot in Colorado Springs. By the early 1950s Alexander was producing between 2000 and 3000 advertisement films a year and had a library covering over 8200 different subjects.
In its heyday, Alexander Film Company's lot hosted 32 full size motion picture sets, modern film and audio laboratories, a sound recording department, an art department capable of creating cartoon animation, stop motion, backgrounds and other special movie effects, an engineering department and a full service print shop. To run this massive complex Alexander employed over 600 people locally and the annual payroll exceeded $2.5 million. A client list included a "who's who" of the nation's leading manufacturers including General Motors, Ford, U.S. Rubber, Philco, and Seven-Up. Regional offices were established in Dallas, New York, Chicago, San Francisco and Los Angeles.

The late 1950s saw the remarkable collapse of Alexander Film Co. through the advent of television and the closing of many local theaters throughout the country. What dealt the most crippling blow, however, was the fact that Alexander was a non-union shop which caused them to be "blacklisted" by industry professionals making it impossible for national advertisers to use Alexander produced commercials. According to surviving employees, after the Alexander Film Company became unionized in the mid 1960s, the plant lost much of the spirit of family that had previously existed between the employees and management.

References 
 history from corporate site for current company
 another history
 Pikes Peak Library District special collections article

Film production companies of the United States
Mass media companies established in 1919